Empress Guo may refer to:

 Guo Shengtong (6–52), wife of Emperor Guangwu of Han
 Guo Nüwang (184–235), wife of Emperor Wen of Cao Wei
 Empress Guo (Cao Rui's wife) (died 264), wife of Emperor Ming of Cao Wei
 Empress Dowager Guo (Tang dynasty) (died 848), wife of Emperor Xianzong of Tang
 Empress Guo (Zhenzong) (975–1007), wife of Emperor Zhenzong of Song
 Empress Guo (Renzong) (1012–1035), wife of Emperor Renzong of Song
 Empress Xiaoyuanzhen (1580–1613), wife of the Taichang Emperor

Guo